To Da Beat Ch'all is the fifth album released by MC Breed. It was released on May 14, 1996 for Wrap Records and featured production from MC Breed, Erick Sermon, DJ Hurricane, Jazze Pha and Eddie Miller. The album was not much of a success, only making it to #34 on the Top R&B/Hip-Hop Albums.

Track listing
"Intro"- 2:13 
"Cum Clean" (featuring The D.O.C.)- 3:48 
"Choose One"- 5:11 (featuring M.C. Brainz) 
"Evil That Men Do"- 4:31 (featuring Sonji Mickey)
"My Walls"- 4:12 (featuring Sonji Mickey)
"Like This"- 4:26 (featuring Sonji Mickey)
"Same Thang"- 3:30 
"16 Switches"- 5:17 
"To Da Beat Ch'all"- 4:13 (featuring Erick Sermon & Sonji Mickey)
"No Chaser"- 4:45 (featuring DJ Hurricane & Jazze Pha)
"Stop That"- 4:24 
"U Can't See Me"- 4:35 (featuring Sonji Mickey)
"Cleverness"- 5:12 (featuring Chuck Nyce, Jamal & Passion)  
"Go There"- 2:58 
"Flossin'"- 4:31

References

1996 albums
MC Breed albums
Albums produced by Jazze Pha
Albums produced by Erick Sermon